In computing, start is a command of the IBM OS/2, Microsoft Windows and ReactOS command-line interpreter cmd.exe (and some versions of COMMAND.COM) to start programs or batch files or to open files or directories using the default program.  is not available as a standalone program.

The command is also one of the basic commands implemented in the Keyboard Monitor (KMON) of the DEC RT-11 operating system.
The TOPS-10 and TOPS-20 operating systems also provide a start command. It is used to start a program in memory at a specified address.

Other environments

 Typical Unix shells (bash, etc.) have no built-in registry of file types and associated default applications. Linux command-line tools with similar functions include xdg-open and run-mailcap.
 On Cygwin, the command is implemented as the  executable. 
 In PowerShell, the Invoke-Item cmdlet is used to invoke an executable or open a file.
 On Apple macOS, the corresponding command is open.
 On Stratus OpenVOS it is start_process.

Syntax

Windows, ReactOS
 start "title" [/D path] [options] "command" [parameters]

Examples

Windows, ReactOS
C:\>start notepad file.txt

C:\>start "C:\My Music\My Song.mp3"

C:\>start www.wikipedia.org

See also
Run command
File association#Microsoft Windows

References

Further reading

External links

start | Microsoft Docs

OS/2 commands
ReactOS commands
Windows administration